The 1895 Iowa Hawkeyes football team represented the University of Iowa during the 1895 college football season. It was the last Hawkeye football team to go without a head coach when the university decided to forgo hiring a professional football coach. The next year, Iowa hired Alfred E. Bull as their coach.

Schedule

References

 MacCambridge, M. (2005) ESPN College Football Encyclopedia. New York: ESPN Books. .
 Lamb, D. and McGrane, B. (1964) 75 Years with the Fighting Hawkeyes. WM. C. Brown Company. 

Iowa
Iowa Hawkeyes football seasons
Iowa Hawkeyes footbal